Sudip Chatterjee (15 December 1959 – 18 September 2006), nicknamed Tulu, was an Indian international football player and coach. He started his career as a centre back and then moved to the right back position before switching to the midfielder role. As a Midfielder, he was considered among the finest in Indian football.

Playing career
Sudip started his playing career with Howrah Sahajatri Club, where his skills were spotted by former India international Arun Ghosh. In 1981, he signed for Calcutta 1st Division league team Bengal Nagpur Railway (BNR) Club. After spending a season with BNR, he joined Kolkata giant Mohun Bagan in 1982. After two seasons with Mohun Bagan, Chatterjee moved to Bagan's arch rival East Bengal Club in 1984. While at East Bengal, Sudip was shifted to Central Midfield by the then coach of the club, Amal Dutta. Sudip remained with East Bengal till 1987. During his stay with East Bengal, he was adjudged the player of the year by the AIFF in 1986. He joined Mohun Bagan again in 1988 and played for them in the corresponding two seasons. In 1990, he returned to East Bengal for a one-year stint. Sudip finally returned to Mohun Bagan in 1991 and retired at the end of 1992 season.

International career
After his 1982 debut with Mohun Bagan as a Central Defender, Sudip was included in the Indian Team for 1982 Asian Games. He was a very dependable member of the Indian Football Team till his retirement in 1992. Sudip represented India in Asian Games, Asia Cup, Pre-World Cup, Pre-Olympic, Merdeka Cup, SAF Games and Nehru Gold Cup. He captained India in SAF Games(1985), Pre-World Cup(1986), Asian Games (1986), Merdeka Cup(1986), Nehru Gold Cup(1985 & 1988) and Asia Cup(1988). 1992 Asia Cup was his last International tournament.

Personal life
Chatterjee used to live at Mandirtala, Howrah, the twin city of Kolkata. After his retirement from football due to ill health, he was subsequently also diagnosed with dementia. On 18 September 2006, a piece of guava choked his respiratory tract and he suffered a cardiac arrest. He was declared dead after being rushed to a nearby hospital. Chatterjee is survived by his wife, a son and a daughter.

Honours

Player
India
South Asian Games Gold medal: 1985; Bronze medal: 1989

Mohun Bagan
IFA Shield: 1989
Sikkim Gold Cup: 1989
All Airlines Gold Cup: 1989
Calcutta Football League: 1992

East Bengal
Durand Cup: 1990
IFA Shield: 1990
Rovers Cup: 1990

Bengal
Santosh Trophy: 1981–82, 1988–89

Manager
Bengal
Santosh Trophy: 1995–96, 1996–97, 1997–98

Individual
Awarded Player of the Decade by AIFF in 1994
Awarded Player of the Year by AIFF in 1986

See also
 List of India national football team captains

References

1959 births
2006 deaths
Indian footballers
People from Howrah
Footballers from West Bengal
India international footballers
1984 AFC Asian Cup players
East Bengal Club players
Mohun Bagan AC players
Calcutta Football League players
Association football midfielders
Indian football coaches
Footballers at the 1982 Asian Games
Footballers at the 1986 Asian Games
Asian Games competitors for India
South Asian Games medalists in football
South Asian Games gold medalists for India